Libor Capalini (born 30 January 1973 in Hořovice) is a modern pentathlete from the Czech Republic who won the bronze medal in the Modern Pentathlon at the 2004 Summer Olympics in Athens, Greece.

References

External links 
 
 

1973 births
Living people
People from Hořovice
Czech male modern pentathletes
Modern pentathletes at the 2004 Summer Olympics
Olympic modern pentathletes of the Czech Republic
Olympic bronze medalists for the Czech Republic
Olympic medalists in modern pentathlon
Medalists at the 2004 Summer Olympics
World Modern Pentathlon Championships medalists
Sportspeople from the Central Bohemian Region